I'll Remember April is a 1945 American comedy film directed by Harold Young and written by M. Coates Webster. The film stars Gloria Jean, Kirby Grant, Milburn Stone, Edward Brophy, Samuel S. Hinds, Jacqueline deWit and Hobart Cavanaugh. The film was released on April 1, 1945, by Universal Pictures. The movie includes a performance of the popular song "I'll Remember April", which had debuted in the 1942 film "Ride 'Em Cowboy" and was already becoming a jazz standard by 1945.

Plot

Cast        
Gloria Jean as April Garfield
Kirby Grant as Dave Ball
Milburn Stone as Willie Winchester
Edward Brophy as Shadow 
Samuel S. Hinds as Garrett Garfield
Jacqueline deWit as Whisper
Hobart Cavanaugh as Joe Billings
Addison Richards as Inspector Pat Malloy
Pierre Watkin as Dr. Armitage
Clyde Fillmore as J.C. Cartwright
Mary Forbes as Mrs. Barrington
Morgan Wallace as Henry Childs
Paul Porcasi as Popolopolis

References

External links
 

1945 films
American comedy films
1945 comedy films
Universal Pictures films
Films directed by Harold Young (director)
American black-and-white films
1940s English-language films
1940s American films